Ponte in Valtellina is a comune (municipality) in the Province of Sondrio in the Italian region Lombardy, located about  northeast of Milan and about  east of Sondrio.

Ponte in Valtellina borders the following municipalities: Castello dell'Acqua, Chiuro, Montagna in Valtellina, Piateda, Teglio, Tresivio, Valbondione.

Demographic evolution

References

External links
 www.comune.ponteinvaltellina.so.it

Cities and towns in Lombardy